Steven Scott Bechler (November 18, 1979 – February 17, 2003) was an American professional baseball pitcher, who played in Major League Baseball (MLB) for the Baltimore Orioles.

After starring for the South Medford High School baseball team, Bechler was selected by the Orioles in the third round of the 1998 MLB draft. Following five seasons in Minor League Baseball, Bechler made his major league debut with the Orioles in 2002.

Attending spring training in 2003, he died of heat stroke while participating in conditioning drills. A medical examiner found that Bechler's use of the supplement ephedra contributed to his death. Following this revelation, the Food and Drug Administration opened an inquiry, which resulted in the banning of ephedra products in the United States. He and Tom Gastall are the only two Orioles to die while still active players.

Early life
Bechler was born on November 18, 1979, in Medford, Oregon, to Ernest and Patricia Bechler. He had one brother. At the age of seven, he began playing baseball. As a youth, he competed in the Medford American Little League, Babe Ruth League, and American Legion Baseball. He was a member of the 1997 American Legion World Series runners-up. Bechler suffered from asthma as a child, and endured heatstrokes while in high school.

Baseball career
Bechler attended South Medford High School in Medford, Oregon. He graduated in 1998. Playing for the school's baseball team, he was named to the All-Oregon third team in his senior year.

Heading into the 1998 Major League Baseball draft, Baseball America rated Bechler the best high school prospect from the state of Oregon. The Baltimore Orioles selected him in the third round draft. Bechler signed with the Orioles, receiving a $257,000 signing bonus. He made his professional debut in Minor League Baseball with the Gulf Coast Orioles of the Rookie-level Gulf Coast League that year. He pitched for the Delmarva Shorebirds of the Class A South Atlantic League in 1999, and for the Frederick Keys of the Class A-Advanced Carolina League in 2000. In 2001, he pitched for Frederick, and was named a Carolina League All-Star. He did not appear in the All-Star Game, as he was promoted to the Rochester Red Wings of the Class AAA International League. After struggling in two outings for Rochester, he was demoted to the Bowie Baysox of the Class AA Eastern League, where he remained for the rest of the season. After the 2001 season, the Orioles assigned Bechler to the Maryvale Saguaros of the Arizona Fall League. The Orioles added Bechler to their 40-man roster to protect him from being eligible in the Rule 5 draft.

In 2002, Bechler pitched for Bowie and Rochester. He had a 2–1 win–loss record with a 3.42 earned run average (ERA) with Bowie and 6–11 record and a 4.09 ERA with Rochester. At the end of the minor league season, the Orioles promoted Bechler to the major leagues. He appeared in three games for the Orioles, pitching  innings, in which he allowed six hits, four walks, three home runs, and recorded three strikeouts. He suffered a strained hamstring in his final appearance.

Personal life
On October 22, 2002, Bechler married Kiley Mae Nixon at Community Bible Church in Central Point, Oregon. The couple were expecting a child at the time of his death. His daughter, Hailie, was born in April 2003.

Death
On February 16, 2003, towards the beginning of Orioles' spring training camp in Fort Lauderdale, Florida, Bechler collapsed while participating in conditioning drills. He was rushed to a nearby hospital, where he died from multiple organ failure the following morning. His body temperature had reached . Against the advice of his trainer, he was taking ephedra; it was reported at the time that he had been taking it to lose weight, though his widow said in 2020 that he had been using it as an energy supplement. While it was also initially reported that Bechler had not eaten for a day or two before his collapse, teammate Matt Riley later recalled that Bechler had gone to dinner with teammates the night before, though he ate very little. However, Bechler did not consume anything aside from ephedra pills on the morning of February 16, possibly because he was running late. 

An autopsy performed by Joshua Perper, a toxicologist serving as the medical examiner for Broward County, concluded that Bechler's death was caused by a pre-existing liver condition, mild hypertension, his weight (he weighed  pounds upon arriving at spring training, and was exercising hard), the heat and humidity of the Florida weather, low food consumption, and the toxicity of ephedra.

At the time of Bechler's death, ephedra was banned by the International Olympic Committee, the National Collegiate Athletic Association, and the National Football League, but not by Major League Baseball, where its use remained common among players. Bud Selig, the Commissioner of Baseball, called for a ban of ephedrine in the wake of Bechler's death. Numerous teams banned the use of ephedra in team clubhouses. Following Bechler's death, the Food and Drug Administration, which had previously chosen not to ban ephedra, re-opened its efforts to regulate ephedra use. The United States Congress dropped its objections to banning ephedra, and Bechler's parents testified in front of Congress. The FDA announced its decision to ban ephedra on December 30.

Bechler was cremated following his death. On the six month anniversary of his death, Kiley scattered his ashes on the pitcher's mound of Oriole Park at Camden Yards. She filed a wrongful death claim against Nutraquest, the manufacturers of the supplement, seeking $600 million in damages. The lawsuit against Nutraquest was suspended in October 2003 when the company filed for bankruptcy under Chapter 11 of the United States Code. Bechler's parents started The Steve Bechler Athletic Scholarship in his memory, which provides $1,000 annually to a graduating South Medford High School baseball or softball player who intends to compete in college.

See also

 List of baseball players who died during their careers

References

External links

1979 births
2003 deaths
Baltimore Orioles players
Baseball deaths
Baseball players from Oregon
Bowie Baysox players
Deaths from hypertension
Deaths from hyperthermia
Deaths from multiple organ failure
Delmarva Shorebirds players
Drug-related deaths in Florida
Frederick Keys players
Gulf Coast Orioles players
Major League Baseball pitchers
Rochester Red Wings players
Sports deaths in Florida
Sportspeople from Medford, Oregon